Kaniuk or Kanyuk (Cyrillic: Канюк) is a surname. It originated from Slavic terms for some bird of prey species. The surname may refer to:

 Anna Kaniuk (born 1984), Belarusian athlete
 Gidi Kanyuk (born 1993), Israeli footballer
 Yoram Kaniuk (1930–2013), Israeli writer

See also
 Kaniuki, villages in Poland
 Kanyuki, village in Russia

Slavic-language surnames